These are the full results of the 1979 IAAF World Cup which was held between 24 and 26 August 1979 at the Olympic Stadium in Montreal, Canada.

Results

100 m

200 m

400 m

800 m

1500 m

5000/3000 m

10,000 m

Men
24 August

110/100 m hurdles

400 m hurdles

3000 m steeplechase

Men
25 August

4 × 100 m relay

4 × 400 m relay

High jump

Pole vault

Men
25 August

Long jump

Triple jump

Men
25 August

Shot put

Discus throw

Hammer throw

Men
25 August

Javelin throw

References

Competition results
Full results
Full Results by IAAF (archived)

IAAF World Cup results
Events at the IAAF Continental Cups